Grêmio Foot-Ball Porto Alegrense, commonly known as Grêmio or Gurias Gremistas, is a Brazilian women's Association football club, based in the city of Porto Alegre, Rio Grande do Sul, Brazil. It is the women's section of Grêmio. They won the  four times.

History
Grêmio played their first match as a women's team in September 1983, and finished second in the year's . The club only returned to an active status in 1997, finishing third in the Gaúcho in that year.

After two runner-up achievements in 1998 and 1999, Grêmio won their first Gaúcho title in 2000, and achieved a second consecutive title in 2001. In 2002, after losing the Gaúcho title to rivals Internacional, the women's football section was closed.

After a period of inactivities, Grêmio re-opened their women's football section in 2017. They won the Gaúcho tournament in 2018. 

In 2019, the team was promoted to the first division of the women's national championship with a victory over a América Mineiro in the quarterfinals. The team clinched a spot in the playoffs in 2020 and 2021, eliminated in both occasions on the quarterfinals.

Players

Current squad

Former players

Honours
 :
 Winners (4): 2000, 2001, 2018, 2022

References

External links
 

Grêmio Foot-Ball Porto Alegrense
Women's football clubs in Brazil
Association football clubs established in 1983
1983 establishments in Brazil